Vyacheslav Dmitriyevich Solovyov (born 18 January 1925; died 7 September 1996) was a Soviet football player and coach. He is also a veteran of the World War II and received such decorations like a medal "For the Defence of Moscow" and a medal "For Courage".

Solovyov was born in a populated place near train station Veshnyaki, Moskovsky Uyezd.

Club career
As a player, he made his professional debut in the Soviet Top League in 1946 for CDKA Moscow. However his playing career has started before the Nazi invasion of the Soviet Union.

Coaching career
It was with Solovyov, Dynamo Kyiv won its first league's title back in 1961.

In 1987 as a manager of SC Tavriya Simferopol, Solovyov reached the 1986–87 Soviet Cup semifinals and gained promotion to the 1988 Soviet First League. His players were honored with titles of masters of sports of the Soviet Union: Borys Biloshapka, Serhiy Shevchenko, Viktor Halustov, Ihor Leonov, Semen Osynovskyi, Ihor Lyalin, Sergei Dementyev, Viktor Budnyk, Oleksandr Isayev.

Honours

As a player
 Soviet Top League champion: 1946, 1947, 1948, 1950, 1951.
 Soviet Top League runner-up: 1949.
 Soviet Top League bronze: 1953.
 Soviet Cup winner: 1948, 1951.

As a coach
 Soviet Top League champion: 1961.

References

1925 births
Footballers from Moscow
1996 deaths
Russian footballers
Soviet footballers
Soviet football managers
Soviet Top League players
PFC CSKA Moscow players
FC Torpedo Moscow players
PFC Krylia Sovetov Samara managers
FC Dynamo Kyiv managers
PFC CSKA Moscow managers
FC Dynamo Moscow managers
FC Dinamo Tbilisi managers
Pakhtakor Tashkent FK managers
SC Tavriya Simferopol managers
FC Alga Bishkek managers
Association football forwards
Soviet military personnel of World War II